Andamia is a genus of combtooth blennies found in the Pacific and Indian Oceans.

Species
There are currently seven recognized species in this genus:
 Andamia amphibius (Walbaum, 1792)
 Andamia cyclocheilus Weber, 1909
 Andamia expansa Blyth, 1858
 Andamia heteroptera (Bleeker, 1857)
 Andamia pacifica Tomiyama, 1955
 Andamia reyi (Sauvage, 1880) (Suckerlip blenny)
 Andamia tetradactylus (Bleeker, 1858)

References

 
Salarinae
Taxa named by Edward Blyth